Chol Chol may refer to:
Chol Chol Chal, a village in Khuzestan Province, Iran
Cholchol River, a river in Chile
Cholchol, a Chilean town at the river Cholchol